The wrongful imprisonment of Victor Nealon occurred in 1996 when the British postman Victor Nealon was mistakenly convicted of attempted rape. He was released in 2013 after spending 17 years in jail, 10 years more than his recommended tariff, because he continued to protest his innocence. He was sentenced to a discretionary life sentence in 1998 and was refused parole because he refused to admit guilt. He was denied legal aid and in 2014, the Ministry of Justice turned down his claim for compensation and demanded he pay £2,500 costs claiming the DNA analysis "did not show beyond reasonable doubt that the claimant did not commit the offence."

The Criminal Cases Review Commission commented that they should have investigated the case more thoroughly and commission chairman Richard Foster said “I regret the fact in this particular case we missed something and I apologise to all concerned for the fact we did so.”

References

Year of birth missing (living people)
Wrongful convictions
False allegations of sex crimes
Living people